James Halcot Mitchell (born September 15, 1948) is a former American football defensive end who played eight seasons in the National Football League (NFL) for the Detroit Lions.

External links
NFL.com player page

1948 births
Living people
Sportspeople from Danville, Virginia
Players of American football from Virginia
American football defensive ends
Virginia State Trojans football players
Detroit Lions players